Afkham is a surname. Notable people with the surname include:

 David Afkham (born 1983), German conductor
 Marzieh Afkham (born 1962/63), spokeswoman of the Iranian Ministry of Foreign Affairs

See also
 Afkhami